Belukurichi is a village panchayat located in Namakkal district in the southern state of Tamil Nadu, India. The village is right below Kolli Hills. The name Belukurichi has its root from 'Velavan Kurunji', meaning the land and hills that belong to Velavan (Murugan)  known as Palaniyappar.

Population and Occupation 
 The village has a population of about 15,000.
 The main occupation of the village is agriculture.

Public Facilities 
 The village has a public high school and a private school
 Public health center (Government Hospital)
 Police Station.
 BSNL exchange.
 Post office.
 Indian postal Index code is (PIN) is 637402.
 STD code 04286.
 Petrol Bunk
 Banks (KVB, Pallavan Grama Bank, Paccs, Cooperative).
 ATM (KVB), Indicash

Palaniyappar Temple 

This place has a beautiful temple known as Palaniyappar Temple atop a hillock called Koogai Malai. The height of this hillock is so small that one can go up to its top on foot within 15 minutes. This hillock is referred to as Koogachalam in the hymns of Arunagirinathar.
This is the place where Lord Muruga disguised himself as a handsome hunter youth to lure and marry Valli.

This temple has got a historical significance, where several kings have visited.

It is also said that the Tamil saint poetess, Avvaiyar whenever visited her friend, Valvil Ori, the then chieftain of the Kolli hills, never left the region without offering her prayers to this Lord Muruga.

The idol is found with his hair knotted atop his head and looks like a hunter. This idol has got a unique feature wherein Lord Muruga holds a rooster (Cheval) in his left hand though resting on his hip.  
In his right hand he holds the vajra vel or the sacred lance.
Typical to a hunter, he has also got a pichuva katthi (a hunter's dagger) in his waist band.
This kind of a Muruga statue or idol holding a rooster is nowhere to be found in the world except this temple. However, similar Muruga idols can be seen in temples like Sikkal etc. which are not the 'moolavar' or at the Sanctum Sanctorum.
The Lord is also depicted as wearing sandals in his feet which is another unique feature (This is also seen in Sikkal)

Thaipusam is a very elaborate festival here which is celebrated with big pomp and show. With more devotees turning up every year, the highlight is the temple car.

Villages in Namakkal district